Events from the year 1907 in Taiwan, Empire of Japan.

Incumbents

Central government of Japan
 Prime Minister: Saionji Kinmochi

Taiwan 
 Governor-General: Sakuma Samata

Births
 5 June – Lee Tze-fan, painter.

 
Years of the 20th century in Taiwan